Dutch wife may refer to:
 a type of body pillow
 a Contour leg pillow
 a long body-length pillow known as dakimakura
 a sex doll
 a long hard bolster, made of materials like rattan, wicker or bamboo, known as Zhufuren
 a hot water bottle
 a sewing kit